Ajak is a town in Szabolcs-Szatmár-Bereg county, in the Northern Great Plain region of eastern Hungary.

At the end of the 19th century and the beginning of the 20th century, Jews lived in the village. In 1910, 83 Jews lived in the village. Some of them were murdered in the Holocaust.

Geography

Birth Place of
Laszlo Szekely, planter and writer who was married to Madelon Szekely - Lulofs.

References

Populated places in Szabolcs-Szatmár-Bereg County
Jewish communities destroyed in the Holocaust